All You Can Eat is the third solo album by Canadian singer k.d. lang, released in October 1995.

Reception 

In a Rolling Stone review, Barry Walters wrote "The rhythms and sonic textures draw from the vintage soul of Al Green, while the stark arrangements and lush melodies embrace the primal sophistication of trend-bucking college-radio faves like Björk and [PJ] Harvey without evoking either. By holding back on vocal volume and letting her creativity loose, Kathryn Dawn ultimately expresses much more. Traditional torch and twang gave her something to master and rebel against, but sublimely sensual art pop has set lang free."

David Browne of Entertainment Weekly described the album as "Ten meditations on unrequited desire, courtship, rejection, and sex, All You Can Eat is both the most brazen and conventional album she’s ever made, and one of her best.  With each new album, lang has gradually toned down the often cloying cowpunk giddiness of her early work. That course continues with Eat, a sober album that musically and lyrically picks up where Ingénue‘s hit 'Constant Craving' left off. The songs are a series of pleas to a lover to allow our tortured chanteuse into her life, each one highlighting varying degrees of optimism, confusion, and bleakness."

In an AllMusic review, Stephen Thomas Erlewine called it "a more experimental and realized record than its predecessor [Ingénue]."

Track listing
All songs written and composed by k.d. lang and Ben Mink
"If I Were You" – 3:59
"Maybe" – 4:11
"You're Ok" – 3:03
"Sexuality" – 3:24
"Get Some" – 3:37
"Acquiesce" – 3:33
"This" – 4:02
"World of Love" – 3:44
"Infinite and Unforeseen" – 2:57
"I Want It All" – 3:39

Personnel
k.d. lang - guitar, harp, ukelin, banjo, glass harmonica, keyboard, vocals
Teddy Borowiecki - organ, synthesizer, piano, keyboard, Fender Rhodes
Graham Boyle - percussion
John Friesen - cello
Ben Mink - bass, guitar, violin, keyboard, ukulele, viola
David Piltch - bass
Randall Stoll - drums

In other media
The song "Sexuality" was also released on Friends Original TV Soundtrack.

Charts

Weekly charts

Year-end charts

Certifications

References

K.d. lang albums
1995 albums
Warner Records albums